Sangeeta Azad (born 24 June 1981) is an Indian politician. She is elected to the Lok Sabha, lower house of the Parliament of India from Lalganj, in Uttar Pradesh in the 2019 Indian general election as a member of the Bahujan Samaj Party.

Personal life
Azad was born on 24 June 1981 to Ramlakhan Bhaskar and Indulata Bhaskar in Azamgarh, Uttar Pradesh. She graduated with a Bachelor of Science degree from Mumbai University in 2003 and Bachelor of Education degree from Veer Bahadur Singh Purvanchal University in 2007. She married Azad Ari Mardan on 25 May 2002, with whom she has a son and two daughters. She does social service and is a businessperson by profession.

References

External links
  Official biographical sketch in Parliament of India website

1981 births
Living people
India MPs 2019–present
Lok Sabha members from Uttar Pradesh
Bahujan Samaj Party politicians
Politicians from Azamgarh district